Leopold Wittelshöfer (14 July 1818, Nagykanizsa, Hungary – 8 January 1889, Vienna, Austria) was an Austrian physician.

He was educated at the University of Vienna (M.D. 1841). After practising medicine for ten years in Raab, Hungary, he moved to Vienna (1851) and became editor of the "Wiener Medizinische Wochenschrift", to which periodical he contributed many essays. He was also the author of "Wiener Heil- und Humanitätsanstalten" Vienna, 1856.

References

 
 BLKÖ: Wittel Höfer, Leopold Biographies of the Empire of Austria

Austrian Jews
19th-century Austrian physicians
Hungarian Jews
People from Nagykanizsa
University of Vienna alumni
1818 births
1889 deaths